Antony Robert Sassi (born 17 May 1978) is an Italian former professional footballer.

Career statistics

Club

Notes

References

External links
 Yau Yee Football League profile
 

Living people
1978 births
Italian footballers
Association football defenders
Hong Kong Premier League players
Hong Kong FC players
Italian expatriate footballers
Expatriate footballers in Hong Kong